Ralf Giesen (born 3 November 1961) is a German athlete. He competed in roller hockey at the 1992 Summer Olympics.

References

External links
 

1961 births
Living people
German roller skaters
Roller hockey in Germany
Summer Olympics competitors for Germany